Malcolm David Eckel is Professor of Religion and Director of the Institute for Philosophy and Religion at Boston University. He received a B.A. from Harvard University, a B.A. and M.A. from Oxford University, and a Ph.D. in the Study of Religion from Harvard. His teaching at Boston University has been recognized by the Metcalf Award for Teaching Excellence (1998), and he has served as the Distinguished Teaching Professor of the Humanities (2002-5). He also has served as Assistant Dean and Director of the Core Curriculum (2007–13), an integrated program in the liberal arts for first- and second-year students in the College of Arts and Sciences.

His publications include Bhāviveka and His Buddhist Opponents (Harvard); Buddhism: Origins, Beliefs, Practices, Holy Texts, Sacred Places (Oxford); To See the Buddha: A Philosopher's Quest for the Meaning of Emptiness (Princeton); Jnanagarbha's Commentary on the Distinction Between the Two Truths: An Eighth-Century Handbook of Madhyamaka Philosophy (State University of New York); and "Is There a Buddhist Philosophy of Nature?" in Theoretical and Methodological Issues in Buddhism and Ecology (Harvard Center for the Study of World Religions). He is the editor of two volumes of essays: India and The West: The Problem of Understanding (Harvard Center for the Study of World Religions) and Deliver Us from Evil (Continuum).

Before joining the faculty at Boston University, he served as Associate Professor at Harvard Divinity School and as Administrative Director of the Harvard Center for the Study of World Religions. He served on the Visiting Committee of Harvard Divinity School from 2008-2013. In 2013, he was invited to deliver a series of lectures entitled “Modes of Recognition: Aspects of Theory in Mahayana Buddhist Narrative” as Visiting Professor in Buddhist Studies at the University of Sydney, Australia. From 1978-1980 he was an Instructor in Religion at Middlebury College.

Bibliography 

 Jnanagarbha's Commentary on the Distinction Between the Two Truths (1987)
 To See the Buddha: A Philosopher's Quest for the Meaning of Emptiness (1994)
 Buddhism: Origins, Beliefs, Practices, Holy Texts, Sacred Places (2002)
 India and The West: The Problem of Understanding and Selected Essays of J. L. Mehta (editor)
 Bhāviveka and His Buddhist Opponents (2008), Harvard Oriental Series, No. 70

References

External links 
Boston University Core Curriculum

Tours
Dr. Eckel leads educational journeys for Far Horizons Archaeological and Cultural trips
 Dr. Eckel's tour page David Eckel

Harvard University alumni
Middlebury College faculty
Harvard Divinity School faculty
Ohio Wesleyan University faculty
Boston University faculty
Living people
Buddhist studies
Year of birth missing (living people)